The 2009 Canada Cup of Curling was held March 18-22 at the Farrell Agencies Arena in Yorkton, Saskatchewan.

Men's

Teams
 Kevin Koe (Defending champion)
 Kevin Martin (2008 Brier Champion)
 Glenn Howard (2008 Player's Championship champion) (dropped out)
 Bob Ursel (Diversified Qualifier) (dropped out)
 Russ Howard (Diversified Qualifier)
 Mike McEwen (Diversified Qualifier)
 Randy Ferbey (3rd, CCA rankings as of Dec. 16, 2008)
 Brad Gushue (4th, CCA rankings as of Dec. 16, 2008)
 Wayne Middaugh (5th, CCA rankings as of Dec. 16, 2008)
 Kerry Burtnyk (6th, CCA rankings as of Dec. 16, 2008)
 Jeff Stoughton (invited as replacement)
 Ted Appelman (invited as replacement)

Round-robin standings

Playoffs

Women's

Teams
 Stefanie Lawton (Defending champion)
 Jennifer Jones (2008 Scotties champion) (dropped out)
 Amber Holland (2008 Player's Championship champion)
 Marie-France Larouche (JSI Qualifier)
 Mary-Anne Arsenault (JSI Qualifier)
 Sherry Middaugh (JSI Qualifier)
 Shannon Kleibrink (1st, CCA rankings as of Dec. 16, 2008)
 Cheryl Bernard (2nd, CCA rankings as of Dec. 16, 2008)
 Kelly Scott (7th, CCA rankings as of Dec. 16, 2008)
 Cathy King (8th, CCA rankings as of Dec. 16, 2008)
 Michelle Englot (invited as replacement)

Standings

Tie-breaker
Englot 7-6 Arsenault

Playoffs

Qualifiers
The four qualifying positions in both the men's and women's events were held December 11-15, 2008. The men's qualifier was held at the Saville Sports Centre in Edmonton while the women's qualifier was held at the Ottawa Curling Club and Rideau Curling Club in Ottawa.

Diversified Transportation Canada Cup Qualifier (Men)

Teams:
 Mike Anderson
 Ted Appelman
 Greg Balsdon
 David Bohn
 Kerry Burtnyk
 Reid Carruthers
 Trevor Clifford
 Chad Cowan
 Robert Desjardins
 Simon Dupuis
 Randy Dutiaume
 Jeff Erickson
 Randy Ferbey
 Martin Ferland
 Sean Geall
 Brad Gushue
 Brad Heidt
 Russ Howard
 Brad Jacobs
 Joel Jordison
 Jamie King
 Jamie Koe
 Kevin Koe
 Marc Lecocq
 Rob Maksymetz
 Kevin Martin
 Mike McEwen
 Rick McKague
 Darrell McKee
 Wayne Middaugh
 Greg Monkman
 Darren Moulding
 Richard Muntain
 Shane Park
 Daley Peters
 Dan Petryk
 Steve Petryk
 Dean Ross
 Chris Schille
 Pat Simmons
 Jeff Stoughton
 Dale Swyripa
 Bob Ursel
 Wade White

John Shea Insurance Canada Cup Qualifier (Women)

Teams:
 Sherry Anderson
 Mary-Anne Arsenault
 Ève Bélisle
 Cheryl Bernard
 Suzanne Birt
 Maureen Bonar
 Suzanne Boudreault
 Chrissy Cadorin
 Chelsea Carey
 Chantelle Eberle
 Michelle Englot
 Kerri Flett
 Alison Goring
 Jenn Hanna
 Julie Hastings
 Amber Holland
 Rachel Homan
 Tracy Horgan
 Kristie Jenion
 Jennifer Jones
 Andrea Kelly
 Cathy King
 Shannon Kleibrink
 Marie-France Larouche
 Carrie Lindner
 Krista McCarville
 Jolene McIvor
 Sherry Middaugh
 Kristie Moore
 Jill Mouzar
 Shelley Nichols
 Hollie Nicol
 Brit O'Neill
 Chantal Osborne
 Karen Porritt
 Heather Rankin
 Julie Reddick
 Allison Ross
 Kelly Scott
 Renée Sonnenberg
 Barb Spencer
 Cindy Street
 Heather Strong
 Crystal Webster

References
Team List

External links
Official website

Cup of Curling, 2009
Sport in Yorkton
Canada Cup (curling)
Curling competitions in Saskatchewan
2009 in Saskatchewan
March 2009 sports events in Canada